Marcel Van Langenhove may refer to:

 Marcel Van Langenhove (fencer), Belgian Olympic fencer
 Marcel Van Langenhove (referee) (born 1944), Belgian football referee